The FIBA Africa Under-20 Championship was a basketball competition in the International Basketball Federation's FIBA Africa zone. The event was held four times before being cancelled in 2004. The winner competed in the FIBA Under-21 World Championship.

Summary

Participating nations

World U-21 Championship record

See also
 FIBA Africa Championship
 FIBA Africa Under-18 Championship
 FIBA Africa Under-16 Championship

References

 
Africa
Under-20